Pyrotecnico is a professional fireworks company based in New Castle, Pennsylvania. The company was founded in 1889 by Constantino Vitale. They currently operate nationwide with over 1,000 technicians throughout the U.S. with six primary offices located in New Castle, Atlanta, Las Vegas, Montgomery, New Orleans, and Tampa. Pyrotecnico has worked with over 10,000 different organizations in the past 10 years including the fireworks and special effects for MTV's halftime show for Super Bowl XXXVIII in Reliant Stadium, Houston, Texas and the 2004 Democratic National Convention. Pyrotecnico was awarded with the 2008 Gold Jupiter Award representing the United States at the L'International des Feux Loto-Québec.

Early days

In 1889 Constantino Vitale started this fireworks company in Pietramelara, Italy. In 1920 he immigrated to the United States through Ellis Island making a home for his family and company in New Castle, Pennsylvania — a small town between Pittsburgh and Cleveland that would become known as "The Fireworks Capital of America."

Twentieth century

Constantino brought with him centuries of fireworks expertise which he taught to his apprentices his children and grandchildren. The Vitale family developed a reputation for grand and dramatic fireworks displays and the business grew rapidly in the United States.

At the turn of the century, the company was one of the largest fireworks companies in the country. By 1940 the company was headed by Constantino's son, Rocco Vitale Sr., who led the expansion of the facilities in New Castle which were also briefly used to manufacture explosives for the U.S. Navy during World War II. Many of these buildings still stand today, across the street from the corporate headquarters.

Five different generations of the Vitale family have grown Constantino's company. In the 1990s the company took on the name "Pyrotecnico" to reflect the variety of products that it used to complement explosives, like confetti, streamer cannons, lighting, fog, smoke, air dancers, close proximity effects and synchronized pyrotechnics to pre-recorded audio or live performance.

Today
Pyrotecnico is still headquartered in New Castle, PA and in 2007, completed a  facility for its headquarters. The company has offices in New Castle, PA; Atlanta, GA; Auburn, NY; Dallas, TX; New Orleans, LA; Las Vegas, NV; Montgomery, AL; Philadelphia, PA / Vineland, NJ; Jaffrey, NH; Columbia, SC; Tampa, FL and Fort Lauderdale, FL.

References
 Pyrotecnico's Official Web Page

Fireworks companies
New Castle, Pennsylvania
Companies based in Lawrence County, Pennsylvania
Manufacturing companies based in Pennsylvania
Manufacturing companies established in 1889
1889 establishments in Italy